Baccaro  is a community in the Canadian province of Nova Scotia, located in the Barrington Municipal District.

Baccaro Point has a weather station (Station ID WCP). It is mainland Nova Scotia's southernmost point. However, there are a few islands, such as Cape Sable Island, that are further south.

See also
 List of communities in Nova Scotia

References

External links

Baccaro on Destination Nova Scotia
Baccaro Point - Hourly Forecast - Environment Canada

Communities in Shelburne County, Nova Scotia
Meteorological stations
Populated coastal places in Canada